Alexander R. Armstrong (6 September 1897, date of death unknown) was a rugby union player who represented Australia.

Armstrong, a number eight, claimed a total of 2 international rugby caps for Australia.

References

Australian rugby union players
Australia international rugby union players
1897 births
Year of death missing
Rugby union number eights